is a Justice of the Supreme Court of Japan.

She was born on March 20, 1949. She attended Keio University (1971) and completed the master’s program at the university’s law school (1974). In 1974, she was admitted as a legal apprentice, and would not begin her judicial career until 1976. From 1976-1985, Okabe worked as an Assistant Judge for various court systems including the Sapporo District Court. She thereafter worked as a judge for other district courts until entering private practice in 1993. On April 12, 2010, Okabe was appointed as a Justice of the Supreme Court of Japan. Prior to her most recent judgeship, she worked as a law professor at Toyo University.

See also 
 Supreme Court of Japan

References 

Supreme Court of Japan justices
Keio University alumni
1949 births
Living people
Japanese women judges